Arbaeen, Chehellom ("the fortieth day") is a Shia religious observance that occurs forty days after the Day of Ashura. It commemorates the martyrdom of Al-Husayn ibn Ali, the grandson of Muhammad, who was martyred on the 10th day of the month of Muharram. Imam Hussain ibn Ali and 71 of his companions were martyred by Ubayd Allah ibn Ziyad's army under the governance of Yazid I in the Battle of Karbala in 61 AH (680 CE).

Arbaeen or forty days is also the usual length of mourning after the death of a family member or loved one in many Muslim traditions. Arbaeen is the largest annual pilgrimage in the world, in which millions of people go to the city of Karbala in Iraq.

Background
According to tradition, the Arbaʽeen pilgrimage has been observed since the year 61 AH of the Islamic calendar (10 October 680) after the Battle of Karbala or the following year. According to tradition, the first such gathering took place when Jabir ibn Abd Allah, a sahabah and the first Arba'ein pilgrim, made a pilgrimage to the burial site of Husayn. He was accompanied by Atiyya ibn Sa'd because of his infirmity and probable blindness. According to tradition, his visit coincided with that of the surviving female members of Muhammad's family and Husayn's son and heir, Imam Ali ibn Husayn Zayn al-Abidin (also spelled Zain-ul-Abideen), who had all been held captive in Damascus by Yazid I, the Umayyad Caliph.

Zayn al-Abidin had survived the Battle of Karbala and led a secluded life in deep worship. He lived under pressure and tight surveillance set by Umayyad Caliphate. 
According to legend, for twenty years whenever water was placed before him, he would weep. One day a servant said to him, 'O son of Allah's Messenger! Is it not time for your sorrow to come to an end?’ He replied, 'Woe upon you! Jacob the prophet had twelve sons, and Allah made one of them disappear. His eyes turned white from constant weeping, his head turned grey out of sorrow, and his back became bent in gloom, though his son was alive in this world. But I watched while my father, my brother, my uncle, and seventeen members of my family were slaughtered all around me. How should my sorrow come to an end?’

Arbaʽeen's performance has been banned in some periods, the last of which was when Saddam Hussein, (a Sunni who ruled as an Arab nationalist, clashing with Islamic revivalism) was president of Iraq. For nearly 30 years under Saddam's regime, it was forbidden to mark Arbaʽeen publicly in Iraq. Following the 2003 invasion of Iraq, the observance in April 2003 was broadcast worldwide.

Annual pilgrimage

The city of Karbala in Iraq is the center of the proceedings which many pilgrims travel miles on foot to reach. As of 2016 "between 17 million and 20 million" pilgrims usually attend Arba'ein there, including about three million foreigners, most of whom are Iranians.

Arbaʽeen is consistently among the largest peaceful gatherings in history. Every year, huge crowds of pilgrims travel to the city of Karbala in pilgrimage to the Imam Hossein holy shrine in Karbala on Arbaʽeen Day. (For example, it is over 500 km from Basra the largest city in southern Iraq where Shia predominate to Karbala.) It is traveled annually on foot by Iraqi pilgrims, which takes them two weeks, or approximately one month to come from other countries like Iran. The crowds become so massive that roads are blocked for hundreds of miles.

In 2008, approximately nine million religious observers converged on Karbala to commemorate Arba'ein. In 2009, over ten million people were estimated to have reached Karbala, according to BBC News and Press TV. In 2013, 20 million pilgrims from 40 countries came for Arba'ein, according to Iranian media. A car bomb targeting worshippers returning from Karbala killed at least 20 Shiite pilgrims in January 2013. In 2014, up to 17 million people made the pilgrimage and many choose to make the 55-mile journey on foot from Najaf, near areas controlled by the militant Islamic State of Iraq and the Levant (ISIL), which has declared Shia Muslims apostates. Up to 17 million pilgrims came in 2015 and 2016.

Ziyarat of Arba'ein 

The Ziyarat Arba'ein is a prayer which is usually recited in Karbala on the day of Arba'ein. It is narrated from Safwan al-Jammaal from Imam Ja'far al-Sadiq, the sixth Shiite Imam, in which the Imam instructed him to visit Imam Husayn's mosque, and to recite a specific visitation prayer on Arba'ein by which the believer should reaffirm their pledge to Husayn's ideals. The Ziarat or prayer is a text which designates Husayn as the "inheritor" of the prophets Adam, Noah, Abraham, Moses, Jesus and Muhammad.

Peace be on the favorite of Allah, Peace be on the beloved friend of Allah, His distinguished hero! Peace be on the choicest confidant of Allah, sincerely attached precisely like his father! Peace be on Hussain, who gave his life in the way of Allah, a martyr, underwent untold hardships Peace be on the hostage surrounded by the tightening circle of sorrow and grief, killed by a horde of savages.

<P>He met with deadly dangers, acted justly and fairly, made use of everything belonging to him to pay full attention to give sincere advice, took pains, made every effort and put his heart, mind, soul and life at the disposal of Thy mission to liberate the people from the yoke of ignorance and evil of bewilderment, but an evildoer, deceived with empty hopes of mean and worthless worldly gains, had pressed heavily on him, and sold out his share (eternal bliss) for the meanest and lowest bargain, betrayed his "day of judgment" for a vulgar return, took pride in insolence, fell into the fathom- well of silly stupid follies, provoked Thee and Thy Prophet to anger, did as the harsh discordant, the hypocrite, the heavily burdened bearers of sin, condemned to Hellfire, advised to him, however, he (the Holy lmam), steadily, rightly and justly coped With them, till, in Thy obedience, gave his life after which his family was set adrift.

Other religions and countries in the Arba'ein
While the Arba'ein is a distinctively Shi'a spiritual exercise, Sunni Muslims and even Christians, Zoroastrians, and Sabians partake in both the pilgrimage as well as serving of devotees. Pilgrims from European countries including Sweden, Russia and even a delegation from Vatican City have joined in past observances. Some Iraqi Christian religious leaders also joined the delegation from the Vatican.

Many delegations from various African countries including Ghana, Nigeria, Tanzania and Senegal have also participated in the Arba'ein.

Political significance 
Since the first Arbaʽeen, it has influenced subsequent Shi'ite uprisings against Umayyad and Abbasid rule. Arba'ein has also been used as a political protest, at least in Iran. It was first used there to protest the killing of supporters of Ayatollah Ruhollah Khomeini in Qom on 5 June 1963 when a general strike was announced. A cycle of Arbaʽeen public observance of mourning rituals of martyred protestors – where an Arbaʽeen observance was held to commemorate those killed in the preceding Arba'ein protest demonstration – is often credited as part of the reason for the success of the 1979 Iranian Revolution that overthrew Shah Mohammad Reza Pahlavi, although that explanation has also been questioned.

Arba'ein in the Gregorian calendar
While Arba'ein is always on nearly the same day (20 or 21 Safar) of the Islamic calendar, the date on the Gregorian calendar varies from year to year because of differences between the two calendars, since the Islamic calendar, the Hijri calendar (AH), is a lunar calendar and the Gregorian calendar is a solar calendar.  Furthermore, the method used to determine when each Islamic month begins varies from country to country (see Islamic calendar).

Arba'ein always falls 40 days after the Day of Ashura. The Day of Ashura, in turn, falls nine days after the first day of Muḥarram. Hence, Arba'ein falls 49 days after the first day of Muḥarram. This date is shown for a selection of years, according to the Umm al-Qura Calendar of Saudi Arabia, in the table below:

Photographs

See also

List of largest peaceful gatherings in history
List of casualties in Husayn's army at the Battle of Karbala

Notes

References

Shia Islam
Islamic festivals
Mourning of Muharram
Islamic terminology
History of Shia Islam